Pier Milan is a town in Victoria, Australia. It is now known for its very small population, currently less than ten. Despite its small populace, it has some key points. For example, there is a caravan park made out of a house, and there are many sand hills. There is a station on the Kulwin railway line. The post office opened as Pier-Millan on 9 May 1911; it was renamed Pier Millan in 1940, and was closed on 30 September 1971.

References